The 2021 Women's European Volleyball Championship was the 32nd edition of the Women's European Volleyball Championship, organised by Europe's governing volleyball body, the CEV. For the second time the Women's EuroVolley was held in four countries: Serbia, Bulgaria, Croatia and Romania.

Qualification

Pools composition
The drawing of lots was combined with a seeding of National Federations and performed as follows:
 The 4 organizers were seeded in Preliminary pools. Serbia in Pool A, Bulgaria in Pool B, Croatia in Pool C and Romania in Pool D.
 The first and second best ranked from the previous edition of the CEV competition were drawn in different Preliminary pools, which meant that Serbia could not be paired with Turkey.
 The organizers could select one team to join their pools, as a result, Azerbaijan joined Serbia in Pool A, Poland joined Bulgaria in Pool B, Italy joined Croatia in Pool C and Turkey joined Romania in Pool D.
 According to the CEV National Team ranking list (as per 01/01/2020), the 16 remaining teams were seeded by descending order in a number of cups that equals the number of Preliminary pools.

Draw
The drawing of lots was held on 20 May 2021 in Belgrade, Serbia.

Squads

Venues

Pool standing procedure
 Number of matches won
 Match points
 Sets ratio
 Points ratio
 If the tie continues as per the point ratio between two teams, the priority will be given to the team which won the match between them. When the tie in points ratio is between three or more teams, a new classification of these teams in the terms of points 1, 2, 3 and 4 will be made taking into consideration only the matches in which they were opposed to each other.

Match won 3–0 or 3–1: 3 match points for the winner, 0 match points for the loser
Match won 3–2: 2 match points for the winner, 1 match point for the loser

Preliminary round
The top four teams in each pool will qualify for the final round.

Pool A

|}

 All times are Central European Summer Time (UTC+02:00).

Pool B

|}

 All times are Eastern European Summer Time (UTC+03:00).

Pool C

|}

 All times are Central European Summer Time (UTC+02:00).

Pool D

|}

 All times are Eastern European Summer Time (UTC+03:00).

Final round

All times in Belgrade are Central European Summer Time (UTC+02:00).
All times in Plovdiv are Eastern European Summer Time (UTC+03:00).

Round of 16

Quarterfinals

Semifinals

3rd place match

Final

Final standing

All Star Team

MVP
  Paola Egonu
Best Setter
  Alessia Orro
Best Outside Hitters
  Miriam Sylla
  Elena Pietrini
Best Middle Blockers
  Eda Erdem Dündar
  Anna Danesi
Best Opposite
  Tijana Bošković
Best Libero
  Monica De Gennaro

See also
2021 Men's European Volleyball Championship

References

External links
Official website

2021
European Championships
International volleyball competitions hosted by Serbia
International volleyball competitions hosted by Croatia
International volleyball competitions hosted by Bulgaria
International volleyball competitions hosted by Romania
August 2021 sports events in Romania
August 2021 sports events in Serbia
September 2021 sports events in Europe
Sport in Cluj-Napoca
Sport in Plovdiv
Sport in Zadar
Sports competitions in Belgrade
21st century in Belgrade
2021 in Bulgarian sport
2021 in Croatian women's sport
2021 in Romanian women's sport
2021 in Serbian sport